The nucleus prepositus (also nucleus prepositus hypoglossi), located in the caudal pons and upper medulla oblongata, contributes to several aspects of gaze control including the horizontal gaze holding system. It functions as a neural integrator.

References

Brainstem